Wolfgang Wilhelm may refer to:

 Wolfgang William, Count Palatine of Neuburg (1578-1653),  a German Prince
 Wolfgang Wilhelm (writer) (1906–1984), German-British screenwriter